Migliarino is a frazione of the comune (municipality) of Fiscaglia in the Province of Ferrara in the Italian region Emilia-Romagna, located about  northeast of Bologna and about  southeast of Ferrara.

References

Cities and towns in Emilia-Romagna